José Machado (1 May 1928 – before 2014) was a Portuguese rower. He competed in the men's eight event at the 1948 Summer Olympics.

References

1928 births
Year of death missing
Portuguese male rowers
Olympic rowers of Portugal
Rowers at the 1948 Summer Olympics
Place of birth missing